Phils Island is the southern of two small islands lying immediately south of Guepratte Island in Discovery Sound, in the Palmer Archipelago. Charted and named in 1927 by DI personnel on the Discovery.

See also 
 List of Antarctic and sub-Antarctic islands

References 

Islands of the Palmer Archipelago